Grandpa in My Pocket is a British children's comedy television series commissioned by Michael Carrington for CBeebies, the BBC's dedicated pre-school and nursery channel targeting children aged 2–7 years. Based on the 1970s The Dandy comic adventure strip Peter's Pocket Grandpa by Ron Spencer (which itself was based on an earlier prose text story called Jimmie's Pocket Grandpa which had appeared in The Dandy in the 1940s), the programme stars James Bolam as a grandfather who owns a magical "shrinking cap", which only his 10-year-old grandson Jason Mason (played by Jay Ruckley) knows about. This cap enables him to shrink to about 4 inches tall, become a CGI-animated character, run very fast, and bring toys and objects to life. This allows him to experience many adventures which are narrated by Jason, including finding a prisoner under the floorboards, bringing a home-made robot to life, and driving Jason's toy car and biplane. The programme also stars Josie Cable, Zara Ramm and Sam Ellis, as Jason's sister, mother and father, respectively. According to the BBC press office, "Grandpa in My Pocket explores the hugely important relationship between grandchildren and grandparents by turning it on its head"

Following the success of the first series in April 2009, a second was commissioned in March 2010, with a third filmed in 2011, after the third season, the series was assumed to have ended, however over 2 years later, a fourth season went into production, in the year 2013, before airing 4 years after filming commenced on the third season.

A fourth series was produced in 2013 with broadcast beginning in 2014.

The fourth season introduces some changes to the plot. Jason, who is now a teenager, has moved with his family into a windmill which they have opened as a hotel. Jason and Jemima's younger cousins Josh and Elsie (played by Harvey Thorn and Sezen Djouma) have come to stay for the summer, and the two become the series narrators as Grandpa decides to let them in on the secret of the shrinking cap.

Production
The first three series of the show was set in the fictional location called "Sunnysands". The exterior scenes were filmed on location in the towns of Southwold and Aldeburgh, in Suffolk. The Masons' house was in Crabbe Street, Aldeburgh. The pier and the lighthouse were in Southwold. The bike and other shops were in Walberswick.

The Masons' windmill for the fourth and fifth series is Cley Windmill, located in Cley next the Sea in Norfolk.

Cast

Main cast
 James Bolam as Jeremy Mason AKA Grandpa (S1-5)
 Jay Ruckley as Jason Mason (S1-3 (main), S4-5 (recurring)
 Harvey Thorn as Josh Mason (S4–5)
 Sezen Djouma as Elsie Mason (S4–5)

Additional cast
 Sam Ellis as Christopher Mason (S1-5)
 Zara Ramm as Julie Mason (S1-5)
 Josie Cable as Jemima Mason (S1-3, guest S4-5)
 Susan Jameson as Great Aunt Loretta (S1-5)
 Tinkerbell c/o Martin Winfield as Beowulf (S1-5)
 Phil Gallagher as Mr Liker Biker (S1-3)
 Shaheen Jafargholi as Troy (S1)
 David Davies as Troy's Dad (S1 E7) 
 Heather Williams as Miss Snip
 Steve Elias as Mr Whoops (S1-5)
 Simon Lys as Mr Hackit
 Lorna Laidlaw as Miss Smiley (S1-5)
 Euan Brown as Eryk
 Alan McMahon as Mr Mentor (S2-5)
 Adrian Truss as Additional Voices
 Sarah Ovens as Amelie
 Gus McQuillin as Hughie Harper
 Todd Kramer as Mr Martian Mortar

Characters

The Family
 Grandpa Jeremy Mason (James Bolam): Jason's grandfather, is what most people see as an ordinary Grandpa, but he is in possession of a magic shrinking cap.
 Jason Mason (Jay Ruckley): the main character for the first three series, He was 10 years old, he alone had knowledge about Grandpa's shrinking cap and had to deal with the trouble it led to.
 Josh (Harvey Thorn): Jason's cousin
 Elsie (Sezen Djouma): Jason's cousin
 Julie Mason (Zara Ramm), known as Auntie Jules to Josh and Elsie: Jason and Jemima's mum and Grandpa's daughter.
 Christopher Mason (Sam Ellis), known as Uncle CJ to Josh and Elsie: Jason and Jemima's dad who works in a bicycle shop. He is quite forgetful, and is a typical clueless dad.
 Jemima Mason (Josie Cable): Jason's older sister. In the fourth series, she has begun a fashion course.
 Great Aunt Loretta (Susan Jameson): Grandpa's bossy, mean & loudmouthed sister who often comes to stay, and cooks disgusting food, like sausages and sardine sauce, and kipper and marmalade sandwiches, and constantly drinks spinach and sprout shake (nicknamed Green Gloop).
 Beowulf (Tinkerbell), also known as Wolfy: Grandpa's Yorkshire Terrier.

Series 1–3
 Mr Whoops (Steve Elias): The accident-prone owner of Sunnysands Toyshop.
 Troy (Shaheen Jafargholi): The spiteful, rude neighbour of the Mason family. (Only appeared in Season 1)
 Troy's dad (David Davies) (Only appeared in 1 episode of Season 1)
 Miss Smiley (Lorna Laidlaw): The happy-go-lucky owner of the Sunnysands cafe.
 Mr Liker-Biker (Phil Gallagher) The optimistic local biker who is more interested in the gear than actually cycling.
 Lady Prigsbottom (Liza Goddard): A highly demanding,rich,posh woman 
 Princess Purpelovna (Rula Lenska): Celebrity film star
 Igor (David Kendall)
 Mr Krumpgrumble (Brian Herring): A taste tester
 Miss Snip (Heather Williams): A dog groomer
 Baby Boris (Izaak Jameson-Lys)
 Mr Hackitt (Simon Lys): A gardener
 Josh (Arthur Byrne), Andrew—Min Boalm
 Bubbles (Elizabeth Franks): Jason and Jemima's bubbly, kind hearted babysitter
 Mr Marvelloso (David Lloyd): A magician
 Rick the Rocking Raver (David Straun): A musician
 Cousin Alvin (Harry Jackson): Jason's cousin
 Miss Pointy-Pencil (Meera Syal): An art teacher
 Speedie Edie (Alex Tregear): A champion cyclist
 Horatio Heave Ho (David Rintoul): A pirate
 Captain Shipshape (Alex Jennings): The captain of a big cruise ship
 Mrs Maridadi (Vivien Heilbron): A dressmaker
 Rodger Splodger (Sanjeev Bhaskar): A painter
 Mr Mentor (Alan McMahon): A wacky inventor who creates words as well as contraptions.
 Grandad Gilbert (Geoffrey Palmer) : Grandpa’s childhood best friend 
 Dora (Maia Tamrakar): Jason's doll obsessed friend 
 Shanay (Paaras Bhardwaj): A shy boy who’s friends with Jason and Jemima
 Floyd (Luke Perry): The Masons' neighbour, a rude, mischievous boastful young boy who loves showing off his stuff, and goes to Jason's school.
 Max (Benjamin Greaves-Neal): Jason's cousin
 Izzy (Ellie Ruiz): Jason's cousin
 Brenda Balderdash (Maggie Ollerenshaw)
 Bernard Balderdash (Geoff Leesley)
 Madame Vibrato (Anne Reid): An opera singing teacher
 Lenora (Sian Thomas): An explorer
 Tiffany Jayne Grottington Pump (Flavia Cheeseman): Jemima's new best friend
 Squeak (Tommy): A kitten belonging to Bubbles the babysitter
 Mr Scoffbucket (Oscar): A goat belonging to Mum's friend

Series 4 and 5
 Olga Orbit (Emilia Fox): an astronomer
 Belinda Lucinda: a girl who is mean to other children.
 Mrs McWhiskit: a famous TV cook, who has her own TV show.
 Connor: Josh's friend
 Mr Yomper Stomper: an adventurer, who forgets why he was at the Mill on the Marsh.
 Teddy: a baby boy in the episode "Squeak! Squeak! Mr Squeak".
 Mr Squeak: a toy mouse which Teddy has.
 Bella la Belter (played by Elain Llwyd): a famous pop singer.

Episodes

Series 1 (2009)
 "Beowulf the Brilliant" [10 February 2009)
 "How to Handle a Hamster" [11 February 2009)
 "Mr Liker Biker's Big Mountain Mission" [12 February 2009)
 "The Robot to Beat all Robots" [13 February 2009)
 "Princess Purpelovna's Plan" [16 February 2009)
 "Mr Krumpgrumble's Visit" [17 February 2009)
 "The Most Splendiferous Sandcastle in Sunnysands" [18 February 2009)
 "A Fabulous Family Photo" [19 February 2009)
 "Miss Smiley's Summer Show" [20 February 2009)
 "The Wonderful World of Mr Whoops" [23 February 2009)
 "Chaos in the Café" [24 February 2009)
 "The Day the Baby Came to Stay" [25 February 2009)
 "A Garden Full of Beasts" [26 February 2009)
 "A Toy for a Boy called Troy" [27 February 2009)
 "Trouble for Bubbles" [2 March 2009)
 "Shake Up and Shape Up" [3 March 2009)
 "Mr Marvelloso's Magic Show" [4 March 2009)
 "A Tuneful Toot on a Trumpet" [5 March 2009)
 "Getting Aunt Loretta Better" [6 March 2009)
 "Sweet Dreams for Cousin Alvin" [9 March 2009)
 "Something to Treasure Forever" [10 March 2009)
 "A Saturday Full of Surprises" [11 March 2009)
 "Magic in the Air" [12 March 2009)
 "Nothing Stops Grandpa" [13 March 2009)
 "Grandpa's Busy Bee Day" [16 March 2009)
 "Captain Dumbletwit's Spaceship Cake" [17 March 2009)

Series 2 (2010)
 "Captain Dumbletwit's Toughest Mission Yet!" [15 February 2010)
 "Mr Mentor's Custard Puff Plopper" [16 February 2010)
 "No Two Rings the Same" [17 February 2010)
 "A Carrot Called Christopher and Other Odd Vegetables" [18 February 2010)
 "Taking Floyd for a Ride" [19 February 2010)
 "Trying to Play with Shy Shanay" [22 February 2010)
 "A Day for a Play at Miss Smiley's Café" [23 February 2010)
 "Jemima's New Best Friend" [24 February 2010)
 "Bubbles and Squeak" [25 February 2010)
 "No More Dolls for Dora" [26 February 2010)
 "A Very Needy Speedy Edie" [1 March 2010)
 "Making the Most of Max" [2 March 2010)
 "Miss Smiley's Strawberry Surprise" [3 March 2010)
 "In It to Win It!" [4 March 2010)
 "Horatio Heave Ho!" [5 March 2010)
 "Great Aunt Loretta's Not-So-Great Plan" [8 March 2010)
 "Mr Whoops' Toy of the Week" [9 March 2010)
 "The Perfect Little Litter Picker" [10 March 2010)
 "Big Elf, Little Elf" [11 March 2010)
 "A Song for Miss Smiley" [12 March 2010)
 "Mr Scoffbucket the Goat" [15 March 2010)
 "Miss Smiley's Dancing Tea" [16 March 2010)
 "A Sunnysands Tick Tock Shock" [17 March 2010)
 "Wulfy's Day with Mr Whoops" [18 March 2010)
 "Captain Shipshape and a Fish Called Bryan" [19 March 2010)
 "Grandpa's Greatest Escape Ever" [20 March 2010)

Series 3 (2010–11)
 "The Magic of Christmas" [15 December 2010)
 "No Ordinary Pig" [14 February 2011)
 "Lighthouse View, as Good as New" [15 February 2011)
 "Boom a Boom Whipp Zing Zoo!" [16 February 2011)
 "Lenora the Explorer" [17 February 2011)
 "A Captain Dumbletwit Box of Tricks" [18 February 2011)
 "No Help for Alvin" [21 February 2011)
 "Mr Mentor's Marvelicious Inventing Club" [22 February 2011)
 "More Than a Biscuit for Mrs McWhiskit" [23 February 2011)
 "A Day to Do What You Like to Do" [24 February 2011)
 "No Mention of an Invention" [25 February 2011)
 "The Sunnysands School for Pirates" [28 February 2011)
 "Mr Greator the Creator" [1 March 2011)
 "Mr Whoops' Wonderful Wedding" [2 March 2011)

Series 4 (2014)
 "A Grandpa Made of Magic" [27 January 2014]
 "Roly Poly Ravioli" [28 January 2014]
 "Miss Smiley's Springtime Make and Do Day" [29 January 2014]
 "An Aussie Afternoon with Bob" [30 January 2014]
 "Squeak! Squeak! Mr Squeak!" [31 January 2014]
 "A Day in Woolly Wonderland" [3 February 2014]
 "The Great Big Sunnysands Cake Bake" [4 February 2014]
 "Mr Munchmould's Cheesy Business" [5 February 2014]
 "There Came a Big Spider" [6 February 2014]
 "The Wonderbubble Weather Watcher" [7 February 2014]
 "Dancing with Delight" [10 February 2014]
 "Mistress Smiley's Medieval Fairground Fun" [11 February 2014]
 "Waffling at the Windmill" [12 February 2014]
 "A Day of Spectacular Surprises" [13 February 2014]
 "The Day the Callminders Called on Mr Whoops" [14 February 2014]
 "A Good Old-Fashioned Party" [17 March 2014]
 "A Cleaning Job for Our Friend Bob" [18 March 2014]
 "Wulfy the Wonderdog" [19 March 2014]
 "Billy Bentice the Apprentice" [20 March 2014]
 "Changes for the Better" [21 March 2014]
 "Mr Greator is Up to No Good" [24 March 2014]
 "Best Behaviour for Barnaby" [25 March 2014]
 "A Souvenir of Sunnysands"[26 March 2014]
 "Things That Go Bump on a Boat" [27 March 2014]
 "A Customer in a Fluster" [28 March 2014]
 "A Mix-up at the Mill" [5 May 2014]

Series 5 (2014)
 "Mr Mentor's Spangly Jangly Dangle Dish" (6 May 2014)
 "Poorly Pansy Petunia" [7 May 2014)
 "Mr Yomper Stomper's Donkey Day" [8 May 2014)
 "Wanda Whoops' World of Whooo!" [9 May 2014)
 "The Balderdashes on Bob's Boat" [12 May 2014)
 "One Man's Junk Is Another Man's Treasure" [13 May 2014)
 "Don't Blame Wulfy" [14 May 2014)
 "Mr Mentor's Whizzywoodlesome Whirly Windwhooper" [15 May 2014)
 "The Mystery of the Missing Millions" [16 May 2014)
 "Cheery Charlie Cheekster's Big Return" [19 May 2014)
 "Mrs Pufferbang's Balloony Beach Bonanza" [20 May 2014)
 "Bertie Beep and His Talking Sheep" [21 May 2014)
 "A Sunnysands Shelter for Bella La Belter" [22 May 2014)
 "A Robodoggy for Miss Snip" [23 May 2014)
 "The Brillioso Beach Treat" [6 October 2014)
 "Great Aunt Loretta on Duty" [7 October 2014)
 "Mighty Mike and a Bear on a Hike" [8 October 2014)
 "Great Aunt Loretta's Dream Date" [9 October 2014)
 "Whizzy William" [10 October 2014)
 "Shiny Gold Stars" [13 October 2014)
 "Captain Dumbletwit's Dress-Up Party" (14 October 2014)
 "In a Muddle with Miss Muddleton" (15 October 2014)
 "A Day for a Piratey Adventure" (16 October 2014)
 "The Magic of the Mill on the Marsh" (17 October 2014)
 "A Passion for Fashion" (20 October 2014)
 "A Dinosaur Called Damian" (21 October 2014)
 Floyd Returns (22 October 2014)
 Can It Be Hard To Find A Dinner? (23 October 2014)
 Leaving The Mill on the Marsh (24 October 2014)

Awards and nominations
 BAFTA Children's Awards 2009 
 BAFTA Children's Awards 2010 
 BAFTA Children's Awards 2011 
 Nominated for Best Pre-School Live Action
 BAFTA – Wales 2010
 Winner – Best Children's Programme

DVD releases
 Warner Home Video: UK (2010–2011), France, USA, Italy (2011–present)
 Abbey Home Media: UK (2011–present)

References

External links
 
 
 
 Grandpa in my Pocket Live: Theatrical stage show

BBC children's television shows
2009 British television series debuts
2014 British television series endings
British children's fantasy television series
British preschool education television series
Television series by DHX Media
Television shows set in England
CBeebies
2000s preschool education television series
2010s preschool education television series